Attila Balázs and Gonçalo Oliveira were the defending champions but chose not to defend their title.

Luca Margaroli and Filip Polášek won the title after defeating Thiemo de Bakker and Tallon Griekspoor 6–4, 2–6, [10–8] in the final.

Seeds

Draw

References

External links
 Main draw

Prosperita Open - Doubles
2019 Doubles